Acropogon bullatus is a species of flowering plant in the family Malvaceae. It is found only in New Caledonia.

References

bullatus
Endemic flora of New Caledonia
Vulnerable plants
Taxonomy articles created by Polbot